opened in Itano, Tokushima Prefecture, Japan, in 1995. The collection includes a dōtaku excavated in Yano, Tokushima City which has been designated an Important Cultural Property. Publications include an Annual Bulletin (since 1989) and Research Reports (No.84 in 2014).

See also
 Tokushima Prefectural Museum
 List of Cultural Properties of Japan - archaeological materials (Tokushima)

References

Museums in Tokushima Prefecture
Archaeological museums in Japan
Museums established in 1995
1995 establishments in Japan
Itano, Tokushima